Hoikka may refer to:

Geography 
 Hoikka, Hyrynsalmi, a village in Hyrynsalmi, Finland
 Hoikka, Joensuu, a village in Joensuu, Finland
 Hoikka, Tuusniemi, a village in Tuusniemi, Finland

People with the surname 
 Iisakki Hoikka (1840–1917), Finnish politician
 Lasse Hoikka, Finnish singer
 Matti Hoikka (1859–1939), Finnish politician